Chetana Nagavajara (born 19 July 1937) is a Professor Emeritus of German language at Silpakorn University, a public university in Thailand. He was Dean of Faculty of Arts (1976–1979) and Vice President of that university (1979–1981) and also served in various government-appointed roles for higher education administrations in the country. As a scholar, his early work includes comparative literature and German literature. He authored books and articles for general and academic audiences in his mother-tongue, Thai as well as English and German. Through his writings and public talks, Nagavajara is later known in Thailand for his contributions to the arts criticism movement and his voice and leadership in the field of the humanities.

Early life and academic career 
Chetana Nagavajara was born in Bangkok, Thailand as the youngest of six children. Both his father and mother were school teachers. Chetana and all of his male siblings attended Debsirin School. He graduated from the school in 1954 and secured the first place in the national matriculation examination for arts students. Nagavajara completed his first year at the Faculty of Arts, Chulalongkorn University and received a Thai Government Scholarship to pursue further studies in the UK. He spent three years in Manchester preparing for his university admission.

Nagavajara obtained a B.A. with Honours in Modern Languages from Cambridge University. He later moved to Germany in 1961 to study under the supervision of Kurt Wais. Nagavajara received his Dr.phil. (magna cum laude) in Comparative Literature from University of Tübingen in 1965. He received honorary doctorates 
from Prince of Songkla University in 1998, Srinakharinwirot University in 2001, Chulalongkorn University in 2004, Mae Fah Luang University in 2005,
Chiang Mai University in 2006 and University of Tübingen in 2009. Granting a second doctorate to the same person in this way was unprecedented at the University of Tübingen and his case has set precedent.

Nagavajara's first placement in Thailand was at the Ministry of Education in 1968. He later moved to Sanam Chandra Palace campus of Silpakorn University in Nakhon Pathom. As one of the first-generation academic staff at the campus, Nagavajara founded the German Department in 1968. He temporarily left the university to become deputy director of the Southeast Asian Ministers of Education Secretariat (SEAMEO Secretariat) under the Southeast Asian Ministers of Education Organization (SEAMEO) for 2 years. During his time in the university, he was also a Vice President for Academic Affairs and Development Planning (1979–1981). Later in 1983, he was promoted to full professor.

Nagavajara was twice visiting scholar at 
University of Michigan-Ann Arbor in 1985 and 1992 and Fulbright Visiting Professor at the University of California, Berkeley in the academic year 1989–1990. He retired as a senior professor (level 11) in 1997 and was appointed Emeritus Professor of German at the university. After official retirement from full-time public service, Nagavajara still continues contributing to the academia by serving on government commissions, university councils and leading research projects after his official retirement.

Work and influences

German and comparative literature 
Nagavajara's 1965 doctoral dissertation discusses August Wilhelm Schlegel's leading role in French literary criticism in 1807–1835. The thesis written in German was later published as his first book in 1966 by the German publisher  in Tübingen. The thesis turned monograph was praised for its role as an impartial literary mediator between France and Germany and was lately cited in the biography of Schlegel by Roger Paulin. His second book "Brecht and France" was published in English by Peter Lang in Bern. In addition to Schlegel and Brecht, he also wrote about Goethe, Mann and contemporary German poetry in Thai language.

Beside his own written works, Nagavajara translated more than 50 pieces of work mainly poetry by other authors, almost exclusively from German to Thai.

Nagavajara wrote a number of English and German books discussing a transboundary culture of humanities between Thailand and Western countries such as "Comparative literature from a Thai perspective. Collected articles 1978–1992", "Fervently Mediating: Criticism from a Thai Perspective, Collected Articles 1982-2004" and "Bridging Cultural Divides: Collected Essays and Reviews 2006-2014". These were published in Thailand by Silpakorn University, Chulalongkorn University Press and Silkworm Books and were well received by the community of scholars.

His work is not without controversies. In August 1998, during the last seminar in the series for this TRF-funded project, poets took an exception to what he presented as "representative Thai poetry" which include lyrics from modern pop songs by Seksan Sukpimai but not highly-regarded modern classics. In his interview with the Bangkok Post, he explained that "The protest by the poets at last August's seminar was brief, and had to do with a misunderstanding concerning the concept of value in poetry."

Thai arts and criticism projects 

Nagavajara has been seasoned arts and literary critic in Thailand for decades. In 1998, The Bangkok Post described him as "... a critic who writes with a sharp pen. His comments can cause playwrights, too, to have second thoughts about their work even when it is playing to sold-out houses, and visual artists pay very close attention to what he has to say..."

As researcher and project leader, Nagavajara initiated and led the research projects "Poetry as a Spiritual and Intellectual Force in Contemporary Society" (1995–1998) and "Criticism as an Intellectual Force in Contemporary Society" (1999–2005). Thai arts criticism research projects under his leadership comprise literary criticism, art criticism, theatre criticism and music criticism. After the conclusion of the two grants (1999–2001 and 2002–2005) from the Thailand Research Fund, the projects were continued and expanded in scope by other research team members while he remains involved as a senior advisor until the conclusion of the last TRF-funded project in 2020.

Examples of notable subjects of Nagavajara's criticism projects are Chart Korbjitti, Angkarn Kalayanapong, Sri Burapha, Atsiri Thammachot, Thailand Philharmonic Orchestra, and visiting foreign orchestras and soloists. Translated Plays, such as Bertolt  Brecht’s  Der gute Mensch von Sezuan (The Good Person of Szechwan) and Jean Anouilh’s Antigone (อันตราคนี or Antrakani in Thai) are also included. Some of his works in this area are published on TRF Criticism Project website.

The grandfather in the story was modeled after him and the children in the story represented team members of the research project. The sequel to the novel Khun Pu Waen Ta Taek (2011) by the same author also featured him as the main character with a new batch of primary level students. The adventures of a grandfather and children in field trips to Wat Pho, National Gallery, Bang Lamphu, Amphawa and Spirit Cave at Pang Mapha and attempts to instill appreciation of the arts and their native roots were the main themes in the two books. Frequent reference to Siam Devadhiraj by the grandfather to express his frustration and various remarks on grandfather's connections to Germany in the two books were inspired by unique characters of Nagavajara.

Humanities education and Thai higher education 
Nagavajara writes extensively about humanities education and higher education in Thailand. His first book on a humanities theme "For survival of the humanities" was published in 1989 and sequels to the first, "Humanities in crisis: a Thai case study" and "Standpoint of humanities" were published in 1995 and 2015 respectively from collection of his essays. For higher education in general, he published essays in a book "Papers on Education" as early as 1981 and continues to present his views and ideas on higher education for decades. His lecture "From (Selfless) Giving to Commodification: The Dilemma of Higher Education" (2013) and "Cultural Consciousness: the Foundation of Thai Higher Education" (2017) given at the workshops "Deans for Change" were published as books by the Knowledge Network Institute of Thailand (KNIT) and were later included in two of his other books.

In addition to his roles as deputy director of the SEAMEO Secretariat, Dean of Faculty of Arts, Vice President of Silpakorn University, Nagavajara was a member of the University Council at 
Ubon Ratchathani University (1993–2003),
Prince of Songkla University (2008–2012) and
Mahidol University (2008–2016).
He was a member of the Governing Board of Ministry of State University Affairs for more than a decade (1987–1990, 1992–2002).
As Thai higher education making a transition into autonomous universities, the board was changed into Civil Servant Commission in Higher Education Institutions and he continued to serve as a member (2005–2009). These appointments to high-profile public positions were royally endorsed by the King and published in the Government Gazette of Thailand.

In an interview with Bangkok Post in the year of his retirement, 1998, he said that it is not that he want to remain a civil servant but it is his sense of gratitude for the Thai Government's scholarship he received for his education in Europe. Nagavajara's guiding principle that he always share with younger Thai scholarship recipients is "Scholarships may be paid back (either through years of service or even in cash), but indebtedness (to those anonymous tax payers who finance your education) is inexhaustible."

Nagavajara chaired a working group at Mahidol University that produced a manual recognizing 22 types of academic products in humanities, social science and the arts for the purpose of academic promotion. Released in 2011, the manual provides details and clarity for the interpretation of the Thai Ministry of Education rules for academic promotion of tertiary instructors which were nationally standardized and enacted for the first time in 2007.

Influences 
Apart from his doctoral advisor, Kurt Wais, and long-term mentor,  in Germany, his arts and literary criticism was influenced by Charles Baudelaire, Bertolt Brecht, Albert Camus, Neville Cardus, Reinhold Grimm, Alexander von Humboldt, F. R. Leavis, Ekavidya Nathalang, Ronald Peacock, Friedrich Schiller, René Wellek. He and his young colleagues were instrumental in carrying out the higher education ideal of a collegiate system conceived by ML Pin Malakul, former Minister of Education and former president of Silpakorn University.

Personal life 
He is married to Tasanee Nagavajara, a professor of French, Chulalongkorn University. They have one son, Tasana, a violinist and two daughters.

Awards and honors

Academic societies 
 2004: Honorary Member of the Siam Society
 1999–2002: Vice President of International Federation for Modern Languages and Literatures
 1982–1988 Member of the Literary Theory Committee of the International Comparative Literature Association (ICLA)

Awards 
 2019: Lifetime Achievement Award, the Thai Chapter of the International Association of Theatre Critics
 2017: 
 2009: Award for Distinguished Authority on the Thai Language, Ministry of Culture, Thailand
 1995: Inaugural TRF Senior Research Scholar
 1994: Alexander von Humboldt Foundation's Humboldt-Forschungspreis award
 1984, 1992: Fulbright Visiting Scholar at University of Michigan-Ann Arbor (twice)
 1989–90: Fulbright Visiting Professor at University of California, Berkeley
 1973: Goethe Medal

Decorations
Thailand
 1994:  Knight Grand Cordon (Special Class) of the Most Exalted Order of the White Elephant 
 1992:  Chakrabarti Mala Medal
 1990:  Knight Grand Cordon (Special Class) of Order of the Crown of Thailand

 Germany
 1996:  Grand Cross 1st Class Order of Merit of the Federal Republic of Germany 
 France
 2003:  Chevalier of the Ordre des Arts et des Lettres

References

External links 
 Catalogue, Leibniz Centre for Cultural and Literary Research, Berlin
 Catalogue, TROVE, National Library of Australia
 Catalogue, British Library, UK
 Bibliography of academic and critical work of Chetana Nagavajara compiled and edited by Sawitree Tongurai (As of 14 February 2021)
  (Academic seminar: 80th year Anniversary of Chetana Nagavajara 2017 Part II) (in Thai)
 Video Interview with Chetana Nagavajara, © Freie Universität Berlin 2016
 ปาฐกถาสิรินธร 2548 (ครั้งที่ 20 เรื่อง ดนตรีกับชีวิต) จุฬาลงกรณ์มหาวิทยาลัย (The 20th Princess Maha Chakri Sirindhorn Lecture at Chulalongkorn University 2005) (in Thai)

Chetana Nagavajara
Living people
University of Tübingen alumni
Alumni of the University of Cambridge
Chetana Nagavajara
Chetana Nagavajara
1937 births
Grand Crosses 1st class of the Order of Merit of the Federal Republic of Germany